Apala (or akpala) is a music genre originally developed by the Yoruba people of Nigeria, during the country's history as a colony of the British Empire. It is a percussion-based style that originated in the late 1930s. The rhythms of apala grew more complex over time, and have influenced the likes of Cuban music, whilst gaining popularity in Nigeria. It has grown less religious centered over time.

Instruments include a rattle (sekere), thumb piano (agidigbo) and a bell (agogô), as well as two or three talking drums.

Haruna Ishola was a notable performer of apala who popularized the genre. It is distinct from, older than, and more difficult to master than fuji music. Although fuji music remains the most important form of traditional music amongst Yorubas in Nigeria, apala is still very popular amongst Muslims of the Yoruba tribe.

References

20th-century music genres
Popular music
African popular music
Nigerian music
Nigerian styles of music
Yoruba music